West Fargo High School is a public high school located in  West Fargo, North Dakota. It serves about 2,000 students and is a part of the West Fargo Public Schools system. The school colors are green and white and the athletic teams are known as the Packers. It is the second largest high school in North Dakota as of the 2018–19 school year. The West Fargo High School is known for its educational system and its great teachers. Covid-19 had  to make the school go into hybrid learning with half of their students online.

Athletics and activities

North Dakota State Championships
State Class 'A’ Baseball: 2012, 2017
State Class 'A' boys' basketball: 1983, 1991, 1992, 2021
State Class 'A' girls' basketball: 1993, 1994, 1998
State Class 'A' football: 1993
State Class 'AAA' football: 1998, 1999, 2002, 2003, 2017
State Class 'A' wrestling: 2006
State Class 'A' volleyball: 2001
State Class 'A' boys' swimming: 2009, 2012
 Girls' hockey: 2010
State Class 'A' boys' Cross Country: 1986
State Class 'A’ One Act Plays: 2013, 2014, 2015, 2018

Notable alumni
Anthony W. England, former NASA shuttle astronaut, graduated from West Fargo High School in 1959
Dane Boedigheimer, filmmaker and YouTuber, creator of the Annoying Orange, graduated in 1997
Jan Maxwell, Broadway and television actress, graduated in 1974
Amber Preston, stand-up comedian, graduated in 1996
Tyler Roehl, football running back, graduated in 2004
Matt Strahm, relief pitcher for the  Philadelphia Phillies, graduated in 2010
Andy Young, infielder who is a free agent, graduated in 2012

References

External links
 

Public high schools in North Dakota
Education in Fargo–Moorhead
North Dakota High School Activities Association (Class A)
North Dakota High School Activities Association (Class AAA Football)
Schools in Cass County, North Dakota
West Fargo, North Dakota